The 2002 Michigan Indy 400 was the eleventh round of the 2002 Indy Racing League season. The race was held on July 28, 2002 at the 2.00 mi Michigan International Speedway in Brooklyn, Michigan. In what many consider to be one of the greatest finishes in IndyCar history, rookie Tomas Scheckter scored his first win in open-wheel competition after charging to the front in a race that saw an astonishing number of passes and lead changes in the closing laps of the race, including the first time a woman has ever led an IndyCar race on merit (Sarah Fisher). Team Cheever teammate Buddy Rice finished in second place in his IndyCar debut while team owner/driver Eddie Cheever crashed during the race. It would be the team's only win of the season and their last in open-wheel racing.

The circumstances surrounding the first-ever IRL-sanctioned race at Michigan made for a dramatic and electric atmosphere: Scheckter, despite his quickness during the season, was more known for his recklessness, frequently crashed and cost Team Cheever several potential wins. Eddie Cheever was grooming Buddy Rice to take over Scheckter's seat in the #52, but due to contractual obligations he could not release Scheckter until the next race at Kentucky Speedway. Nevertheless, Cheever gave Rice the preferred equipment, spare parts, and pit crew for the race. Scheckter, now on a personal vendetta, dominated the race from pole position, led the most laps, but almost gave up the win after a poor late-race pit stop, falling back to 12th place, the last car on the lead lap. From there, he ferociously battled his way back to the front in an amazing display of raw speed and talent. Despite the win, Scheckter was still let go from Team Cheever after Kentucky.

The prevalence of drafting allowed for the field to race in tight side-by-side packs, not unusual for NASCAR events but very unusual for open-wheel races. Drivers would often swap positions each lap in order to take advantage of the draft and gain ground on the next competitor. This became especially important during the last twenty-five lap sprint to the finish when multiple drivers jockeyed for position.

Qualifying

Race

 Includes two bonus points for pole position and leading the most laps.

Race Statistics
Lead changes: 25 among 9 drivers

Standings after the race
Drivers' Championship standings

 Note: Only the top five positions are included for the standings.

External links
Full race available on IndyCar's official YouTube page.

References

2002 in IndyCar
Michigan Indy 400
2002 in sports in Michigan